Mark Christopher may refer to:

 Mark Christopher (radio host), talk radio host
 Mark Christopher (director) (born 1963), screenwriter and director